is a freelance Japanese voice actress previously affiliated with Mausu Promotion. She was born in Osaka Prefecture and raised in Adachi, Tokyo.

Filmography

Television animation
2000s
Hand Maid May (Mika, Miyuki Zin, Woman)
Go! Go! Itsutsugo Land (Karin)
Super GALS! (Girl)
Star Ocean EX (Cecil)
Hanaukyo Maid Team (Ringo)
Aquarian Age: Sign for Evolution (EGO Girl)
Secret of Cerulean Sand (Jane Buxton)
Inuyasha (Girl)
Wolf's Rain (Girl)
Kimi ga Nozomu Eien (Female Salesperson)
Chrono Crusade (Nelly, Sister Mary)
Mermaid Melody: Pichi Pichi Pitch (Caren, Meru)
R.O.D -The TV- (Newscaster)
Gilgamesh (Quinque)
Naruto (Naruto Uzumaki's Sexy Technique)
Sasami: Magical Girls Club (Ryo-Ohki)
Night Wizard The Animation (Akari Himuro, Anzelotte)

2010s
Princess Jellyfish (Emcee)
Naruto Shippuden (Naruto Uzumaki's Sexy Technique)
Aokana: Four Rhythm Across the Blue (Arika Okoze)

OVA
Fushigi Yūgi Eikoden (Saori Kawai)
To Heart 2 (Waitress of Mystery)

Video games
Aokana: Four Rhythm Across the Blue (Arika Okoze)
Atelier Annie: Alchemists of Sera Island (Fitz Erberlin)
Bloody Roar 4 (Mana the Ninetails)
Boktai series (Lita, Carmilla)
Crash Bandicoot: The Wrath of Cortex (Coco Bandicoot)
Crash Nitro Kart (Coco Bandicoot)
Crash Twinsanity (Coco Bandicoot)
Di Gi Charat Fantasy (Hinagiku)
Galaxy Angel series (Almo)
Shinobido: Way of the Ninja (Princess)
Lunar Knights (Carmilla)
Way of the Samurai (Suzu)
Princess Maker 5 (Michiru Kobayakawa)

Drama CDs
Mix Mix Chocolate (Schoolgirl 1)

Dubbing roles

Live-action
H2O: Just Add Water (Charlotte Watsford)
ER Season 12, Episode 252 (Sidney)

Animation
Codename: Kids Next Door (Numbuh 3)
Invader Zim (Tak)
Lilo & Stitch (Elena)
Little Robots (Rusty)

References

External links
 
 Ema Kogure at Ryu's Seiyuu Info

1976 births
Living people
Japanese video game actresses
Japanese voice actresses
Mausu Promotion voice actors
Voice actresses from Osaka Prefecture
Voice actresses from Tokyo
People from Adachi, Tokyo
20th-century Japanese actresses
21st-century Japanese actresses